Zois Ballas (born 1987) is a Greek professional basketball player. He is 2.05 m (6 ft 8  in) in height and he plays at the power forward position.

Professional career
Ballas played with AEK Athens, Doukas, and Doxa Lefkadas.

References

External links
Eurobasket.com Profile
AEK.com Profile

1987 births
Living people
Greek men's basketball players
AEK B.C. players
Doukas B.C. players
Doxa Lefkadas B.C. players
Panionios B.C. players
Power forwards (basketball)